.eus is the top-level domain for the Basque language. The abbreviation eus comes from the Basque endonym euskara, meaning "Basque language". Before its creation, .eu (European Union) domain was also used for this purpose, although unofficially.

History 
In 2008, dotCYMRU, dotEUS, dotSCOT, and dotBZH formed ECLID. In May of 2012, the PuntuEus foundation applied to ICANN have a domain that represented the Basque language. On 10 June 2013, ICANN approved the creation of the domain. Use of the domain name was restricted until March–April 2014. However, ICANN facilitated an eus qualified launch program that allowed certain websites to claim a .eus domain before this General Registration date.

Registration Policy 
Like many domain name, .eus has requirements for websites registering under it. Websites under this domain must follow the Registration Policy set forth by the .eus TLD, the Registration Agreement provided by the sponsoring registrar, and any other policies mandated by ICANN.

Those who do register must have membership to the Basque linguistics and cultural community as well as have a website that is beneficial to the community. Domain names under .eus are distributed at a "first come fist serve" basis, and are processed in chronological order of the receipt for the domain.

References

External links
puntu.EUS

EUS
EUS
2013 introductions